is a train station in Nichinan, Miyazaki Prefecture, Japan.

Lines

Layout 
The station consists of an island platform serving two tracks on a sidehill cutting grade. The station building is a functional wooden structure of modern design which is unstaffed and serves only as a waiting room. Access to the island platform is by means of a level crossing. From the access road, a flight of steps leads up the cutting to the station building. There is no station forecourt and no parking available at the foot of steps.

Adjacent stations

History
The line and its stations closed when the Miyazaki Railway ceased operations on 1 July 1962. Subsequently, Japanese National Railways (JNR) extended its then Shibushi Line north from  towards Minami-Miyazaki using largely the same route. The linkup, which included the reopening of several previously closed stations, was completed on 8 May 1963, and inc whereupon the route was renamed the Nichinan Line. Ibii was one of several new intermediate stations which were also opened on the same day. With the privatization of JNR on 1 April 1987, the station came under the control of JR Kyushu.

Passenger statistics
In fiscal 2016, the station was used by an average of 14 passengers (boarding only) per day.

See also
List of railway stations in Japan

References

External links
Ibii (JR Kyushu)

Railway stations in Miyazaki Prefecture
Railway stations in Japan opened in 1963